Pureiromba (also, Pureilomba or Puleilompa) is a God in Meitei mythology and religion. He is the giver of rain and agricultural prosperity. He is one of the major Umang Lai deities. He is the Ancestor God of the Angom clan of the Meitei ethnicity.

History 
According to the Thalon text, Pureiromba was one of the 5 gods of 5 different places of the Selloi Langmai Hill (Nongmaiching Hill). Before the Meitei King Ura Konthouba (c. 7th century CE) killed all the Selloi Langmai people, the cults of these five gods were put together into that of a single God with the name "Langmai Ningthou" (lit. King of the Langmais). The personal names became the other names or various forms of the God. With this, the tribal society of the Selloi Langmai people became one chiefdom. This chiefdom later became the Angom clan.

Description 
The people who worship Pureiromba think of him as their ancestor. However, no one knows if he was a real person from history or a god that acted like a human. But the ancient texts that show his adventures in the human world show him as a strong, powerful and able founding ancestor. He was initially associated with a Loi village of Andro, Imphal East. But in later times, the people of Moirang worshipped him as one of their deified ancestors.

Festival 
The religious festival of Lai Haraoba is celebrated in honor of God Pureiromba in the months of Kalen (April-May). The Haraoba of Pureiromba belongs to the type of the Chakpa Haraoba. Chakpa Haraoba is one of the four types of Lai Haraoba.
At Andro, Imphal East, on the last day of the celebration of Pureiromba, a small mound of rice offerings is piled up by the maibis. Out of rice, the maibis construct a small landscape of mountain ranges, ravines, lakes, rivers, etc.

Cults and pantheons 
There are pantheons dedicated to God Pureiromba and his son Chinsongba in the village of Andro, Imphal East in Manipur.
God Pureiromba is also regarded as the ancestor of the people of the Sharumbam clan of Meitei ethnicity. The cult of Pureiromba was looked after by the people of Mangsatabam clan of Meitei ethnicity.

Namesakes

Pureiromba Youth Club 
The Pureiromba Youth Club, Bamon Kampu, Imphal is a youths' club of Manipur. It reported to the Government of Manipur about the case of Thangjam Manorama.

See also 
 Panam Ningthou

References

External links 

 INTERNET ARCHIVE, Pureiromba
 E-PAO, Pureiromba
 E-PAO, Pureilomba
 

Abundance deities
Abundance gods
Agricultural deities
Agricultural gods
Creator deities
Creator gods
Earth deities
Earth gods
Fertility deities
Fertility gods
Food deities
Food gods
Fortune deities
Fortune gods
Harvest deities
Harvest gods
Health deities
Health gods
Kings in Meitei mythology
Life-death-rebirth deities
Life-death-rebirth gods
Magic deities
Magic gods
Maintenance deities
Maintenance gods
Meitei deities
Names of God in Sanamahism
Nature deities
Nature gods
Ningthou
Peace deities
Peace gods
Rain deities
Savior deities
Savior gods
Time and fate deities
Time and fate gods
Tutelary deities
Tutelary gods